Jacqueline E. Lapsley (born February 24, 1965) serves as Dean and Vice President of Academic Affairs and Professor of Old Testament at Princeton Theological Seminary. She earned an M.A. from the University of North Carolina at Chapel Hill, an M.Div. from Princeton Seminary, and a Ph.D. from Emory University.

In Old Testament studies, Lapsley is known for writings and teachings in feminist biblical interpretation and the intersection of environmental issues and biblical interpretation, as well as in Ezekiel studies. Lapsley's interests are in literary theory, ethics (especially creation ethics), gender theory and theological anthropology as tools for reading the Old Testament theologically. Her past courses cover sin, women in Old Testament narratives, and salvation in the Old Testament, wherein she focuses on the ways in which moral formation and identity are articulated in the scriptures. Her current courses are in gender theory and creation ethics in the Old Testament.  Her current research and writing focuses on the relationship between human dignity and creational dignity.

Lapsley, Bruce C. Birch, Cynthia D. Moe-Lobeda, and Larry L. Rasmussen, co-authored the Bible and Ethics in the Christian Life: A New Conversation (Fortress, 2018); edited the “Gender and Method” issue of Hebrew Bible and Ancient Israel (2016); coedited with Patricia Tull, After Exegesis: Feminist Biblical Theology (Baylor University Press, 2015), coedited with Carol A. Newsom and Sharon H. Ringe, a revision of A Women’s Bible Commentary, 3rd edition (Westminster John Knox Press, 2012), was associate editor of A Dictionary of Scripture and Ethics (Baker Academic, 2011), authored Whispering the Word: Hearing Women’s Voices in Old Testament (Westminster John Knox Press, 2005), among other works. In 2012 A Dictionary of Scripture and Ethics (Baker Academic, 2011) was awarded the Reference Book of the Year by the Academy of Parish Clergy.

She serves on the editorial boards of The Catholic Biblical Quarterly, Hebrew Bible and Ancient Israel, and the new Interpretation Commentary Series (with co-editors Brian Blount, Beverly Gavanta, and Samuel Adams). She was for many years the director of the Center for Theology, Women, and Gender at Princeton Theological Seminary and co-chair of the Ethics and Biblical Interpretation section of the Society of Biblical Literature. Lapsley is also an ordained Presbyterian elder and teaches and preaches in congregations. In addition to writing and teaching, she has been on The Farminary steering committee at Princeton Theological Seminary and was the chair of the Earth Care Team in her local congregations.

For Lapsley: "The Bible offers important perspectives on human finitude and limits. It also offers perspectives on human vocation--what are we supposed to be doing while on earth? In the Bible, we read about a God who cares not just about us, human beings, but also about how we treat non-human creatures. This biblical vision of the nature and integrity of creation is diametrically opposed to the attitude of the industrialized West toward the environment. How did the Bible's vision become so distorted in the Christian West that we have produced such widespread environmental degradation?"   She also claims that “an appreciation of gender diversity can move our society toward real justice for women and other persons who are marginalized because of gender and/or sexuality."

As a scholar Lapsley is committed to the academic study of the Bible for the life of faith and all active participants in living faith communities and feel called to witness to the power of informed scriptural interpretation for the flourishing of self, faith communities, and the world.

Select publications

“A Theology of Creation—Critical and Christian," in Theology of the Hebrew Bible: Jewish and Christian Readings (SBL Resources for Biblical Study Monograph; Atlanta: SBL, 2016).
“The Proliferation of Grotesque Bodies in Ezekiel: The Case of Ezekiel 23,” in Ezekiel: Current Debates and Future Directions (FAT 1; Mohr Siebeck, 2016).
“New Books: Old Testament,” The Christian Century (April 2016).
“Reading Psalm 146 in the Wild," in After Exegesis: Feminist Biblical Theology in Honor of Carol A. Newsom, ed. Jacqueline E. Lapsley and Patricia K. Tull (Waco, TX: Baylor University Press, 2015), 77–90.
“Dignity for All: Humanity in the Context of Creation," in Restorative Readings: Old Testament, Ethics, Human Dignity, ed. Bruce C. Birch and Julianna Classes (Louisville: WJK, 2015), 141–144.
The Old Testament and Ethics: A Book-by-Book Survey, co-editor with Joel Green (Grand Rapids: Baker Academic, 2013).
A Women’s Bible Commentary, revised, 3rd edition (20th anniversary edition), co-editor with Carol Newsom and Sharon Ringe (Westminster John Knox Press, 2012).
A Dictionary of Scripture and Ethics, associate editor with Joel Green (general editor), and Rebekah Miles, Allen Verhey (associate editors) (Baker Academic, 2011).
“Ezekiel,” in The New Interpreter’s Bible One Volume Commentary, ed. Beverly Roberts Gaventa and David Petersen (Abingdon Press, 2010).
Character Ethics and the Old Testament: Moral Dimensions in Scripture, coedited with M. Daniel Carroll R. (Westminster John Knox Press, 2007).
“Alternative Worlds: Reading the Bible as Scripture In Engaging Biblical Authority: Perspectives on the Bible as Scripture, edited by William P. Brown (Westminster John Knox Press, 2007)
“Ezekiel Through the Spectacles of Faith In Reformed Theology: Identity and Ecumenicity II: Biblical Interpretation in the Reformed Tradition, edited by Michael Welker and Wallace M. Alston Jr. (Wm. B. Eerdmans, 2007).
“A Feeling for God: Emotions and Moral Formation in Ezekiel In Character Ethics and the Old Testament: Appropriating Scripture for Moral Life, edited by M. Daniel Carroll R. and Jacqueline E. Lapsley (Westminster John Knox Press, 2007).
Whispering the Word: Hearing Women’s Stories in the Old Testament (Westminster John Knox Press, 2005).
Can These Bones Live?: The Problem of the Moral Self in the Book of Ezekiel (Walter de Gruyter, 2000).

References 

20th-century American women writers
21st-century American women writers
20th-century American theologians
21st-century American theologians
Women Christian theologians
Living people
American women academics
1965 births
University of North Carolina at Chapel Hill alumni
Princeton Theological Seminary faculty
Emory University alumni
Princeton Theological Seminary alumni
Christian feminist theologians